The Netherlands was represented by Milly Scott, with the song "Fernando en Filippo", at the 1966 Eurovision Song Contest, which took place on 5 March in Luxembourg City. Five acts participated in the Dutch preselection, which consisted of five qualifying rounds, followed by the final on 5 February. All the shows were held at the Tivoli in Utrecht, hosted by the 1959 Eurovision winner Teddy Scholten.

Scott earned a place in Eurovision history as the first black performer to appear on stage, and would later state that she believed her poor result at Eurovision was attributable, at least in part, to racism.

Before Eurovision

Nationaal Songfestival 1966

Heats
Five qualifying heats took place on consecutive evenings between 31 January and 4 February. Each involved one of the selected acts performing three songs, with the jury winner from each act going forward to the final. A different jury of 15 was used each evening. The format was the same used in the 1965 preselection, and would be used again 30 years later in the preselection of 1996.

Final
The national final was held on 5 February. The winning song was chosen by the same five juries who had each individually chosen one of the songs for the final. Each jury member gave 1 point to their favourite song, and "Fernando en Filippo" was the choice of 52 of the 75 members.

At Eurovision 
On the night of the final Scott performed 16th in the running order, following France and preceding Ireland. Voting was by each national jury awarding 5-3-1 to its top three songs, and at the close of the voting "Fernando en Filippo" had received 2 points, placing the Netherlands 15th of the 18 entries. During most of the voting procedure "Fernando en Filippo" had appeared to be heading for the infamous nul-points, until the last two countries to vote (Ireland and the United Kingdom) each awarded 1 point to the song. The Dutch jury awarded its 5 points to Belgium.

The Dutch conductor at the contest was Dolf van der Linden.

Voting

References

External links
 Netherlands selection 1966

1966
Countries in the Eurovision Song Contest 1966
Eurovision